Grégory Hofmann (born November 13, 1992) is a Swiss professional ice hockey forward who is currently under contract to EV Zug of the National League (NL). Hofmann was drafted in the third round, 103rd overall, by the Carolina Hurricanes in the 2011 NHL Entry Draft. He won two National League (NL) titles, one with HC Davos in 2015 and one with EV Zug in 2021.

Playing career
On April 15, 2015, at the conclusion of the 2014–15 season, Hofmann left HC Davos after three seasons and signed a four-year contract with HC Lugano worth CHF 3.2 million.

Hofmann was invited to the 2017 Carolina Hurricanes rookie camp in September.

In the final year of his contract with Lugano, Hofmann agreed to a four-year contract worth CHF 4.8 million with EV Zug on December 3, 2018. The contract starts from the 2019–20 season and runs through the 2022–23 season.

While leading Zug in scoring through the 2020–21 season, on February 13, 2021, Hofmann's NHL rights were traded from the Carolina Hurricanes to the Columbus Blue Jackets in exchange for a 2022 7th round pick.

On June 14, 2021, Hofmann agreed as a free agent to a one-year one-way contract with the Columbus Blue Jackets of the National Hockey League (NHL). In his debut North American season, Hofmann made the Blue Jackets roster to start the  season. On 14 October 2021, Hofmann made his long-awaited NHL debut against the Arizona Coyotes. On 25 October 2021, Hofmann scored his first NHL goal against the Dallas Stars. Hofmann registered two goals and 7 points through 24 regular season games before he was granted permission to return to Switzerland for the birth of his first child on 30 December 2021. Following the birth, Hofmann opted to remain in Switzerland due to family considerations, and he was suspended by the Blue Jackets on 10 January 2022. On 14 January 2022, Hofmann cleared waivers and the Blue Jackets terminated his contract, allowing him to return to EV Zug.

International play

Hofmann participated at the 2012 World Junior Ice Hockey Championships as a member of the Switzerland men's national junior ice hockey team.

Hofmann participated in the 2016 IIHF World Championship with Switzerland men's team. Selected again for the 2018 IIHF World Championship, he won a silver medal.

Career statistics

Regular season and playoffs

International

References

External links

1992 births
HC Ambrì-Piotta players
Carolina Hurricanes draft picks
Columbus Blue Jackets players
HC Davos players
Living people
HC Lugano players
Ice hockey players at the 2018 Winter Olympics
Ice hockey players at the 2022 Winter Olympics
Olympic ice hockey players of Switzerland
Swiss ice hockey forwards
EV Zug players
People from Biel/Bienne
Sportspeople from the canton of Bern